Hot Country Songs is a chart that ranks the top-performing country music songs in the United States, published by Billboard magazine.  In 1970, 23 different singles topped the chart, which was published at this time under the title Hot Country Singles, in 52 issues of the magazine, based on playlists submitted by country music radio stations and sales reports supplied by stores.

In the issue of Billboard dated January 3, 1970, "Baby, Baby (I Know You're a Lady)" by David Houston replaced the final chart-topper of 1969, Charley Pride's "(I'm So) Afraid of Losing You Again" at number one.  Houston's single held the top spot until the January 31 issue, when it was replaced by Tom T. Hall's song "A Week in a Country Jail".  Hall had achieved success as a songwriter, including penning the song "Harper Valley PTA" which had been both a pop and country number one for Jeannie C. Riley in 1968,  but "A Week in a Country Jail" was his first number one as a performer.  Hall also wrote "The Pool Shark", which gave Dave Dudley his one and only week at number one.  Husband-and-wife duo Jack Blanchard & Misty Morgan also reached number one for the first and only time with "Tennessee Bird Walk".  Lynn Anderson topped the chart for the first time with "Rose Garden", which was also a major crossover hit, reaching the top five of Billboards all-genres chart, the Hot 100.  Hank Williams Jr., the son of one of the most influential country singers of all time, Hank Williams, achieved the first number one of a career which would go on to span more than fifty years when he collaborated with the Mike Curb Congregation on the single "All for the Love of Sunshine".

Sonny James spent the most weeks at number one of any artist, his four chart-toppers totalling fourteen weeks in the top spot.  "It's Just a Matter of Time", "My Love", "Don't Keep Me Hangin' On" and "Endlessly" formed part of a streak of sixteen consecutive number ones for James, which ran from 1967 until 1971.  Three other artists took multiple singles to number one during 1970.  Charley Pride had three chart-toppers totalling six weeks at number one, the highest total after the fourteen achieved by James, and Conway Twitty and Tammy Wynette each achieved two number ones.  Twitty and his frequent duet partner Loretta Lynn both reached number one in 1970 with tracks which came to be regarded as their respective signature songs: "Hello Darlin'" and the autobiographical "Coal Miner's Daughter".  The final number one of the year was "Rose Garden" by Lynn Anderson, which began a run atop the chart in the issue of Billboard dated December 26 which would last until the issue dated January 30, 1971.

Chart history

See also
1970 in music
List of artists who reached number one on the U.S. country chart

References

1970
1970 record charts
Country